The Neftchi Baku 2012–13 season is Neftchi Baku's 21st Azerbaijan Premier League season, and their third season under manager Boyukagha Hajiyev. Neftchi participated in the Second and Third UEFA Champions League qualifying rounds, defeating FC Zestafoni of Georgia in the Second round before losing to Ironi Kiryat Shmona of Israel in the Third round. This meant that they dropped down into the 2012–13 UEFA Europa League Play Off Round, where they defeated APOEL of Cyprus 4–2 on aggregate to qualify for the group stages of the Europa League for the first time. In the group stages they were drawn against FK Partizan of Serbia, Rubin Kazan of Russia and Internazionale of Italy. They also won the Azerbaijan Premier League for the 3rd time in a row, and completed a domestic double by defeating Khazar Lankaran on penalties in the Azerbaijan Cup final.

Squad 

 (captain)

Out on loan

Transfers

Summer

In:

 
 

Out:

Winter

In:

 

Out:

Coaching staff

Competitions

Friendlies

Azerbaijan Premier League

Results summary

Results by round

Results

League table

Azerbaijan Premier League Championship Group

Results summary

Results by round

Results

Table

Azerbaijan Cup

UEFA Champions League

Qualifying phase

UEFA Europa League

Play Off Round

Group stage

Squad statistics

Appearances and goals

|-
|colspan="14"|Players who appeared for Neftchi no longer at the club:

Goal scorers

Disciplinary record

Monthly awards

Team kit
These are the 2012–13 Neftchi Baku kits.

References

Qarabağ have played their home games at the Tofiq Bahramov Stadium since 1993 due to the ongoing situation in Quzanlı.
Neftchi Baku played their home matches at Tofiq Bahramov Republican Stadium, Baku instead of their regular stadium, Ismat Gayibov Stadium, Baku.
Neftchi Baku played their home match at Dalga Arena, Baku as their own Ismat Gayibov Stadium did not meet UEFA criteria.
Ironi Kiryat Shmona played their home match at Kiryat Eliezer Stadium, Haifa as their own Kiryat Shmona Municipal Stadium did not meet UEFA criteria.

External links 
 Neftchi Baku at Soccerway.com

Neftchi Baku
Neftchi Baku
Neftçi PFK seasons
Neftchi Baku